Clinical Health Promotion is Prevention, which includes elements of health promotion and rehabilitation, which takes place in the health care system together with patients.

The intention is to focus on and integrate prevention into a patient's pathways to reduce disease progression, prevent complications and relapse as well as maximize coping and quality of life. Clinical health promotion emanates from the health care system where the patient is the active/activated part and hence the efforts also include elements of health promotion and rehabilitation.

Emphasis is placed on keeping choice and accountability with the patient, as well as empathy, feedback and positive expectations for the patient. The target audience is patients and the arena may be primary or secondary care where professionals in interaction with patients are engaged in clinical health promotion.

Examples 
Examples of clinical health promotion are:
 Smoking cessation for pregnant women
 Alcohol cessation before surgery
 Physical activity program for mentally ill
 Diabetes education
 Control of asthma patients.

References

External links 
 Clinical Health Promotion - Research and Best Practice for patients, staff and community

Health promotion